Stella Bruzzi, FBA (born 28 January 1962) is an Italian-born British scholar of film and media studies and currently Dean of Arts and Humanities at University College London.

Career 
From 2006 to 2017, Bruzzi was Professor of Film and Television Studies at the University of Warwick. In 2017, she moved to University College London, where she is Executive Dean of its Faculty of Arts and Humanities. She has previously taught at the University of Manchester and at Royal Holloway, University of London.

Honours
In 2013, Bruzzi was elected a Fellow of the British Academy (FBA), the United Kingdom's national academy for the humanities and social sciences.

Selected works

References

1962 births
Living people
British mass media scholars
Film educators
Academics of the University of Manchester
Academics of Royal Holloway, University of London
Academics of the University of Warwick
Place of birth missing (living people)